Løseth is a Norwegian surname. Notable people with the surname include:

 Erling Løseth (1927–2013), Norwegian politician 
 Lene Løseth (born 1986), Norwegian alpine skier 
 Mona Løseth (born 1991), Norwegian alpine skier
 Nina Løseth (born 1989), Norwegian alpine skier

Norwegian-language surnames